Bradleyville is an unincorporated community in northeastern Taney County, Missouri, United States.   It is located at the intersection of Route 76 and Route 125 above the west bank of Beaver Creek. Bradleyville is part of the Branson, Missouri Micropolitan Statistical Area.

History
A post office called Bradleyville has been in operation since 1861. The community has the name of the local Bradley family. The community was listed on the Census Bureau as incorporated from 1920 to 1970. Bradleyville reincorporated in 2002. The village disincorporated in 2009.

References

Former villages in Missouri
Unincorporated communities in Taney County, Missouri
Populated places disestablished in 2009
Branson, Missouri micropolitan area
Unincorporated communities in Missouri